Five Sisters may refer to:

 The Five Sisters (Aarhus), a silo complex in Denmark
 Five Sisters (Burlington, Vermont)
 Five Sisters of Kintail, a ridge with five summits in the Northwest Highlands of Scotland
 Five Sisters Productions, American film production company
 Five Sisters (West Calder), a group of shale bings north of the mining village in Scotland
 Five Sisters window, in York Minster, England
 The five Barrison Sisters, a late 19th-century vaudeville act
 Satellite Sisters, an ABC Radio program featuring five sisters
 Five American oil companies (Standard Oil of California, Standard Oil of New Jersey, Standard Oil of New York, Texaco, and Gulf Oil) which were the first to obtain oil concessions in the Middle East; see also Seven Sisters (oil companies)